The Shahin Haxhiislami is a multi-use stadium in Peć, Kosovo. It is currently used mostly for football matches and is the home ground of Besa Pejë of the Kosovar Superliga. The stadium holds 8,500 people.

Notes and references
Notes:

References:

External links
Stadium information

Peć